Amurn is a village in Darwaz District, Badakhshan Province in north-eastern Afghanistan.

Geography
The village is located near the border with Tajikistan. It lies 1.8 miles from Yeylaq-e Amurn, 3.9 miles from Delvakh, 4.3 miles from Manzel, Afghanistan and 4.7 miles from Ablun, Afghanistan.

Transport
Amurn is located on the M41 motorway which connects it with Tajikistan. The nearest airport is 42 miles away at Khorog.

References

External links
Satellite map at Maplandia.com

Populated places in Nusay District